Jennifer Nicole Freeman, often credited as Jennifer N. Freeman, is an American actress and spokesmodel. She is best known for playing the role of Claire Kyle in the sitcom My Wife and Kids (introduced in season 2) and her film roles in You Got Served (2004), and Johnson Family Vacation (2004).

Career
Freeman is best known for playing the role of Claire Kyle (replacing Jazz Raycole) in the ABC sitcom My Wife and Kids. She has also made guest appearances on TV such as 7th Heaven, Switched!, One on One, and The OC. Her music video appearance is B2K's "Girlfriend". She is a spokesmodel for the Neutrogena skincare.

Freeman's TV credits include My Wife and Kids, 7th Heaven, Even Stevens, and Lizzie McGuire. Her film credits include feature roles in Johnson Family Vacation, You Got Served and Mercy Street. She also appeared in films such as The '70s and The Visit. Her stage credits include the L.A.-area productions of The Wiz, in which she played Dorothy, and Billa in The Gift.

Freeman began a nationwide print and television campaign as one of "the young fresh faces" of Neutrogena. In 2003, TV Guide named her as one of the Top 10 Hot Teens to watch. In 2018, Freeman released a self-help book, Journey to Loving Yourself.

Personal life
Freeman married basketball player Earl Watson in early 2009. They have a daughter together.
In August 2010 they separated, and briefly reconciled in 2011, until they divorced in March 2015.

Filmography

Film

Television

Music videos

References

External links

Living people
People from Long Beach, California
African-American actresses
American television actresses
American film actresses
American child actresses
1985 births
21st-century African-American women
21st-century African-American people
20th-century African-American people
20th-century African-American women